This list of the Cenozoic life of Montana contains the various prehistoric life-forms whose fossilized remains have been reported from within the US state of Montana and are between 66 million and 10,000 years of age.

A

  Abies
 †Abies alvordensis
 †Abies concoloroides
 †Abies laticarpa
 Acer
 †Acer bendirei
 †Acer bolanderi
 †Acer glabroides
 †Acer minor
 †Acer newberryi
 †Acer oregonianum
 †Acer scottiae
 †Acer silberlingi
 †Acheronodon
 †Acheronodon garbani – type locality for species
  Acipenser
 †Acmeodon
  †Acritohippus
 †Acritohippus isonesus
 †Acritoparamys
 †Acritoparamys atavus – type locality for species
 †Actinodonta
 †Adjidaumo
 †Adjidaumo intermedius – or unidentified comparable form
 †Adjidaumo minimus – type locality for species
 †Adunator
 †Adunator ladae
  †Aelurodon
 †Aelurodon ferox – or unidentified comparable form
 †Aelurodon montanensis – type locality for species
  †Aepycamelus
 †Aepycamelus stocki
 †Agnotocastor
 †Agnotocastor montanus
  †Agriochoerus
 †Agriochoerus maximus – type locality for species
 †Agriochoerus minimus
 †Agrostis
 †Agrostis primaeva
 †Ailanthus
 †Ailanthus americana
 Alangium
 †Alangium thomae
 †Alepidophora
 †Alepidophora maxima – type locality for species
 †Alismaphyllites
 †Alismaphyllites grandifolius
 Alnus
 †Alnus jarbidgana
 †Alnus protomaximowiczii
 †Alnus relata
 †Alphagaulus
 †Alphagaulus pristinus
  †Amebelodon
 †Amebelodon floridanus – or unidentified comparable form
  Amelanchier
 †Amelanchier couleeana
 †Amelanchier covea
 †Amentotaxus
 †Amentotaxus campbelli
 Amia
 †Amia fragosa
 †Amia uintaensis
 †Ampelopsis
 †Ampelopsis acerifolia
 †Amphechinus
 †Amphechinus horncloudi
  †Amphicyon
 †Amphicyon riggsi – type locality for species
 †Amynodon
 †Amynodon advenus – or unidentified comparable form
 †Amyzon
 †Anacodon
 †Anacodon ursidens – or unidentified comparable form
 Anas
 †Anas platyrhynchos – or unidentified comparable form
 †Ancenycteris
 †Ancenycteris rasmusseni
 †Anconodon
 †Anconodon cochranensis
 †Anconodon gidleyi – type locality for species
 †Anemia
 †Anemia elongata
  †Angustidens
 †Angustidens vireti – or unidentified comparable form
 †Anisonchus
 †Anisonchus oligistus
 †Anisonchus sectorius
 †Ansomys
 †Ansomys hepburnensis – type locality for species
 †Ansomys nexodens
 †Antholithes
 †Antholithes asterias – type locality for species
 †Antholithes botryanthera – type locality for species
 †Antholithes divaricanthera – type locality for species
 †Antholithes explodens – type locality for species
 †Antholithes glandulifera – type locality for species
 †Antholithes onagracioides – type locality for species
 †Antholithes tropaeoloides – type locality for species
 †Antholithes tulipoidea – type locality for species
 †Antholithes umbelloidea – type locality for species
 †Antholithes urnanthera – type locality for species
 †Antholithes zygomorpha – type locality for species
  Antilocapra – or unidentified comparable form
 †Antilocapra americana
  †Aphelops
 †Aphronorus
 †Aphronorus fraudator – type locality for species
 †Aphronorus orieli
 †Apternodus
 †Apternodus baladontus – type locality for species
 †Apternodus mediaevus – type locality for species
 †Araceaeites
  †Araucaria
 †Araucaria longifolia
  †Archaeocyon
 †Archaeocyon leptodus
 †Archaeohippus
 †Archaeolagus
 †Archisyrphus – type locality for genus
 †Archisyrphus opacus – type locality for species
  †Arctocyon
 †Arctocyon ferox
  †Arctodus
 †Arctodus simus
 †Arctostaphylos
 †Arctostaphylos cuneata
 †Ardynomys
 †Ardynomys occidentalis – type locality for species
 †Arretotherium
 †Arretotherium acridens – type locality for species
 Arundo
 †Arundo pseudogoepperti
 Arvicola
 †Arvicola richardsonii
 †aspera
 †aspera aspera
  †Astronium
 †Astronium truncatum
 †Athyana
 †Athyana haydenii
 †Atoposemys
 †Atoposemys entopteros
 †Aulolithomys
 †Aulolithomys bounites – type locality for species
 †Averrhoites
 †Averrhoites affinis
 †Avunculus
 †Avunculus didelphodonti – type locality for species
 †Axestemys
 †Axestemys montinsana
  Azolla
 †Azolla elegans – type locality for species
 †Azolla fragilis – type locality for species
 †Azolla velus

B

 †Baioconodon
 †Baioconodon denverensis – or unidentified comparable form
 †Baioconodon engdahli – type locality for species
 †Baioconodon nordicus – type locality for species
 †Baiotomeus
 †Baiotomeus douglassi
 †Baiotomeus lamberti – type locality for species
 †Bathygenys
 †Bathygenys alpha – type locality for species
  †Berberis
 †Berberis acanthoides
 Berchemia
 †Berchemia huanoides
 †Beringiaphyllum
 †Beringiaphyllum cupanioides
 †Bessoecetor
 †Bessoecetor septentrionalis
 Betula
 †Betula fairii
 †Betula stevensoni
 †Betula thor
 †Betula vera
 Bibio – or unidentified related form
 Bison
 †Bison bison
  †Bison latifrons – or unidentified comparable form
 †Bisonalveus
 †Bisonalveus browni
  †Blastomeryx
 †Blastomeryx gemmifer
 †Bootherium
  †Borealosuchus
 †Borealosuchus sternbergii
  †Brachychampsa
  †Brachycrus
 †Brachycrus laticeps
 †Brachyerix
 †Brachyerix incertis
 †Brachyrhynchocyon
 †Brachyrhynchocyon dodgei
 †Brachyrhynchocyon montanus – type locality for species
 †Browniea
 †Browniea serrata

C

 †Caesalpinites
 †Caesalpinites acuminatus
 †Caesalpinites coloradicus
 †Calycites
 †Calycites hexaphylla
  †Camelops
 †Camelops minidokae
 †Camponotites
  †Canavalia
 †Canavalia eocenica
 Canis
 †Canis latrans
  †Canis lupus
 †Canna
 †Canna flaccidafolia
 †Carcinodon
 †Carcinodon aquilonius
 †Cardiospermum
 †Cardiospermum terminalis
 Carpinus
 †Carpinus fraterna
 †Carpinus lanceolata
 †Carpites
 †Carpites amygdaloides – type locality for species
 †Carpites carumcarvi – type locality for species
 †Carpites eludens – type locality for species
 †Carpites gracilens – type locality for species
 †Carpites paniculatus – type locality for species
 †Carpites polygonoides
 †Carpites pruniformis – type locality for species
 †Carpites racemosus – type locality for species
 †Carpites verrucosus
 †Carpodaptes
 †Carpodaptes hazelae – type locality for species
 †Carpodaptes jepseni – tentative report
  †Carpolestes
 †Carpolestes nigridens – type locality for species
  Carya
 †Carya antiquorum
 †Carya libbeyi
 †Cassia
 †Cassia fayettensis
 †Cassia hesperia
 †Cassia reticuloides
 Castanea
 †Castanea dolichophylla
 †Castanea intermedia
 †Castanea miomollissima
 †Castanea spokanensis
 †Castanea spolanensis
 Castor
 †Castor californicus
  †Castor canadensis
 †Catalpa
 †Catalpa rubyensis – type locality for species
 †Catopsalis
 †Catopsalis alexanderi
 †Catopsalis waddleae
 Ceanothus
 †Ceanothus prespinosus
 †Ceanothus variabilis
 Cedrela
 †Cedrela lancifolia
 †Cedrela pteraformis
  †Celastrus
 †Celastrus typicus
 Celtis
 †Celtis aspera
 †Celtis aspera (Newberry)
 †Celtis chaneyi
 †Celtis kansana
 †Celtis mccoshii
 †Celtis peracuminata
 †Centetodon
 †Centetodon kuenzii – type locality for species
 †Centetodon magnus
 Cercidiphyllum
 †Cercidiphyllum arcticum
 †Cercidiphyllum articum
 †Cercidiphyllum crenatum
 †Cercidiphyllum elongatum
 †Cercidiphyllum genetrix
  Cercis
 †Cercis parvifolia
 †Cercis spokanensis
  †Cercocarpus
 †Cercocarpus antiquus
 †Cercocarpus beaannae
 †Cercocarpus myricaefolius
 †Chadrolagus
 †Chadrolagus emryi
 †Chaetoptelea
 †Chaetoptelea microphylla
 †Chamaecyparis
 †Chamaecyparis linguaefolia
 †Chamops
 †Chamops segnis – or unidentified comparable form
  †Champsosaurus
 †Chiromyoides
 †Chiromyoides potior
  †Chisternon
 †Chisternon interpositum – type locality for species
 †Chriacus
 †Chriacus baldwini
 †Chriacus calenancus
 †Chriacus pelvidens
 †Chriacus punitor
 †Chthonophis – type locality for genus
 †Chthonophis subterraneus – type locality for species
  †Cimexomys
 †Cimexomys minor – type locality for species
 †Cimolestes
 †Cimolestes incisus
  Cinnamomum
 †Cinnamomum sezannense
 Cissus
 †Cissus marginata
 †Claenodon
 †Claenodon montanensis
  Clematis
 †Clematis ellensburgensis
 Cocculus
 †Cocculus heteromorpha
 †Colodon
 †Colodon cingulatus
 †Colodon kayi – type locality for species
 †Colodon woodi – or unidentified comparable form
 †Colpoclaenus
 †Colpoclaenus keeferi – tentative report
 †Colpoclaenus procyonoides – or unidentified comparable form
 †Colubrina
 †Colubrina asiatica – or unidentified comparable form
 †Colubrina preelliptica
 †Compsemys
 †Compsemys victa
 †Coniferites
 †Coniferites conicus – type locality for species
 †Coniferites ovatus – type locality for species
 †Coniferites strobiliformis – type locality for species
  †Coniophis – or unidentified comparable form
 †Coniophis precedens
 †Contogenys
 †Contogenys ekalakaensis – type locality for species
 †Contogenys sloani
 †Conzattia
 †Conzattia coriacea
 †Copedelphys
 †Copedelphys stevensoni – or unidentified comparable form
 †Copedelphys titanelix – type locality for species
 †Copemys
 †Copemys lindsayi – type locality for species
 †Coriphagus
 †Coriphagus montanus – type locality for species
  Cornus
 †Cornus cornella
 †Cornus hyperborea
 †Cornus ovalis
 †Corylus
 †Corylus insignis
  †Coryphodon
 †Coryphodon proterus – type locality for species
 †Cosmocomoidea
 †Cosmocomoidea greenwalti – type locality for species
 †Cosmocomoidea kootenai – type locality for species
 †Cosmocomoidea rasnitsyni – type locality for species
  †Cosoryx – tentative report
 Crataegus
 †Crataegus elwyni
 †Crataegus pacifica
  †Credneria
 †Credneria daturaefolia
 Crematogaster
 †Crematogaster aurora – type locality for species
 †Crustulus – type locality for genus
 †Crustulus fontanus – type locality for species
 †Cryptoryctes – type locality for genus
 †Cryptoryctes kayi – type locality for species
  Culiseta
 †Culiseta kishenehn – type locality for species
 †Culiseta lemniscata – type locality for species
 †Cupidinimus
 †Cupidinimus halli – type locality for species
 †Cyclurus
 †Cyclurus fragosus
 †Cylindrodon – type locality for genus
 †Cylindrodon fontis – type locality for species
 †Cynodesmus
 †Cynodesmus thooides – type locality for species
 Cynomys
  †Cynomys ludovicianus

D

 †Dalbergia
  †Dalbergia retusa
 †Daphoenictis – or unidentified comparable form
 †Davidia
 †Davidia antiqua
 †Davispia – type locality for genus
 †Davispia bearcreekensis – type locality for species
 †Derrisemys – type locality for genus
 †Derrisemys sterea – type locality for species
 †Desmatochoerus
 †Desmatochoerus hatcheri – type locality for species
 †Desmatolagus – tentative report
 †Deuterogonodon
 †Deuterogonodon montanus – type locality for species
  †Diceratherium
 †Diceratherium annectens
 †Diceratherium armatum
 †Diceratherium radtkei – type locality for species
 †Didymictis
 †Dillerlemur
 †Dillerlemur pagei – type locality for species
  †Dinictis
  †Dinohippus
 †Dioctria – tentative report
 †Dioctria jamesi – type locality for species
 †Diospyros
 †Diospyros oregoniana
 †Diphysa
 †Diphysa presuberosa
 †Diplodipelta – type locality for genus
 †Diplodipelta reniptera
  Dipteronia
 †Dipteronia insignis
 †Dissacus
 †Dixella
 †Dixella curvistyla – type locality for species
 †Dixella eomarginata – type locality for species
 †Dixella intacta – type locality for species
 †Dixella spinilobata – type locality for species
 Dolichoderus
 †Dolichoderus dlusskyi – type locality for species
 †Domnina
 †Domnina gradata – or unidentified comparable form
 †Domnina thompsoni – type locality for species
 †Domninoides
 †Dorraletes
 †Dorraletes diminutivus
 †Douglassciurus
 †Douglassciurus jeffersoni – type locality for species
 †Downsimus
  †Dromomeryx
 †Dromomeryx borealis
 †Dryinoides – type locality for genus
 †Dryinoides oxyrhachis – type locality for species
 Dryopteris
 †Dryopteris lakesi
 †Dryopteris serrata

E

  †Ectocion
 †Ectocion cedrus
 †Ectocion collinus
 †Ectoganus
 †Ectoganus lobdelli
 †Ectypodus
 †Ectypodus aphronorus – type locality for species
 †Ectypodus laytoni – or unidentified comparable form
 †Ectypodus lovei
 †Ectypodus powelli – or unidentified comparable form
 †Ectypodus szalayi – type locality for species
 †Ellipsodon
 †Ellipsodon lemuroides
  †Elomeryx – tentative report
 †Elphidotarsius
 †Elphidotarsius florencae – type locality for species
 †Elphidotarsius russelli
 †Elpidophorus
 †Elpidophorus elegans
 †Elpidophorus minor – type locality for species
 †Entoptychus
 †Entoptychus montanensis
 †Eoanaphes – type locality for genus
 †Eoanaphes stethynioides – type locality for species
 †Eoanomala – type locality for genus
 †Eoanomala melas – type locality for species
 †Eoconodon
 †Eoconodon hutchisoni
 †Eoconodon nidhoggi
 †Eoeustochus – type locality for genus
 †Eoeustochus borchersi – type locality for species
 †Eoeustochus kishenehn – type locality for species
 †Eoformica
 †Eoformica brevipetiola – type locality for species
 †Eoformica latimedia – type locality for species
 †Eoformica pinguis
 †Eogyropsylla
 †Eogyropsylla paveloctogenarius – type locality for species
 †Eolestes
 †Eolestes ramosus – type locality for species
 †Eolestes syntheticus
  †Eotitanops
  †Epicyon
 †Epicyon haydeni
  †Epihippus
 †Epihippus gracilis – or unidentified comparable form
 †Epoicotherium
 †Epoicotherium unicum
  †Equisetum
 †Equisetum aquatile – type locality for species
 †Equisetum arcticum
 †Equisetum octangulatum
 Equus
  †Equus conversidens – or unidentified comparable form
 †Equus proversus
 Erucius – tentative report
 †Erucius lewisi – type locality for species
 †Eucastor
 †Eucastor tortus
 †Eucommia
  †Eucommia montana
 †Eucommia serrata
 †Eudaemonema
 †Eudaemonema cuspidata – type locality for species
 †Euhapsis – tentative report
 †Eumys
 †Eumys brachyodus
 †Eumys elegans
 †Eumys parvidens – or unidentified comparable form
  †Euonymus
 †Euonymus pacificus
 †Euoplocyon
 †Euoplocyon brachygnathus
 †Euroxenomys
 †Euroxenomys inconnexus – type locality for species
 †Eutypomys
 †Eutypomys inexpectatus – or unidentified comparable form
 †Eutypomys montanensis – type locality for species
 †Eutypomys parvus
 Exbucklandia
 †Exbucklandia oregonensis
 Exechia – or unidentified related form
 †Exostinus
 †Exostinus lancensis

F

 †Fagopsis
 †Fagopsis longifolia
 Ficus
 †Ficus affinis
 †Ficus artocarpoides
 †Ficus planicostata
 †Ficus subtruncata
 Fidiobia
  Fokienia
 †Fokienia catenulata
 Formica
 †Formica annosa – type locality for species
 †Fraxinus
 †Fraxinus brevialata
 †Fraxinus eocenica
 †Fraxinus flexifolia
 †Fraxinus rupinarum

G

 †Galbreathia
 †Galbreathia bettae
 †Gelastops
 †Gelastops parcus – type locality for species
  Geochelone
 †Geochelone primaeva – type locality for species
  Gerrhonotus – or unidentified comparable form
 †Gingerichia – type locality for genus
 †Gingerichia geoteretes – type locality for species
 Ginkgo
  †Ginkgo adiantoides
 Gleichenia
 †Gleichenia hesperia
 Glyptostrobus
 †Glyptostrobus nordenskioldi
 †Glyptostrobus oregonensis
 †Goniacodon
 †Goniacodon levisanus
 †Gregorymys
 †Gregorymys douglassi – type locality for species
 †Gripholagomys – tentative report

H

 †Habrosaurus
 †Habrosaurus dilatus
 †Hamamelites
 †Hamamelites inaequalis
 †Haplaletes
 †Haplaletes andakupensis
 †Haplaletes disceptatrix – type locality for species
 †Haplomylus
 †Haplomylus palustris – type locality for species
 †Helaletes
 †Helaletes nanus
 †Heliscomys
 †Heliscomys gregoryi
 †Heliscomys mcgrewi – or unidentified comparable form
 †Heliscomys ostranderi
 Helius
 †Helius constenius – type locality for species
  †Helodermoides – type locality for genus
 †Helodermoides tuberculatus – type locality for species
 †Hendryomeryx
 †Hendryomeryx defordi – or unidentified comparable form
  †Herpetotherium
 †Herpetotherium fugax
 †Herpetotherium knighti – or unidentified comparable form
 †Herpetotherium valens
 †Hesperhys
 †Hesperhys vagrans
 Hesperinus – or unidentified related form
  †Hesperocyon
 †Hesperocyon gregarius
 †Heteraletes
 †Heteraletes leotanus
  †Hiodon
 †Hiodon consteniorum – type locality for species
  Holmskioldia
 †Holmskioldia speiri
 †Holopogon
 †Holopogon archilestes – type locality for species
 Homo
 †Homo sapiens
  †Homotherium
 †Homotherium serum
 †Huerfanodon – or unidentified comparable form
 †Hutchemys – type locality for genus
 †Hutchemys rememdium – type locality for species
  †Hyaenodon
 †Hyaenodon crucians
 Hydrangea
 †Hydrangea knowltoni
 †Hydromystria
 †Hydromystria expansa
  †Hyopsodus
 †Hyopsodus sholemi
  †Hypertragulus
 †Hypertragulus calcaratus
 †Hypisodus
 †Hypisodus minimus
 †Hypohippus
 †Hypohippus osborni – or unidentified comparable form
 †Hypolagus
 †Hypolagus vetus
 †Hypsiops
 †Hypsiops breviceps – type locality for species
 †Hyrachyus
 †Hyrachyus douglassi – type locality for species
 †Hyracodon
 †Hyracodon medius
 †Hyracodon priscidens

I

 †Ictidopappus
 †Ictidopappus mustelinus – type locality for species
 †Ignacius
 †Ignacius frugivorus
 †Ilex
 †Ilex acuminata – later renamed Ilex mormonica 
 †Ilex mormonica – type locality for species. Formerly known as Ilex acuminata.
 †Intyrictis
 †Intyrictis vanvaleni
 †Ischyrhiza – or unidentified comparable form
 †Ischyrhiza avonicola
  †Ischyromys
 †Ischyromys douglassi – type locality for species
 †Ischyromys typus
 †Ischyromys veterior – type locality for species
  Isoetes
 †Isoetes trullata – type locality for species
 †Isoetites
 †Isoetites horridus
 Isonychia
 †Isonychia alderensis – type locality for species

J

 †Jepsenella – type locality for genus
 †Jepsenella praepropera – type locality for species
 †Judithemys
 †Judithemys backmani
 †Juglandicarya
 †Juglandiphyllites
 †Juglandiphyllites glabra
 Juglans
  †Juglans regia – or unidentified comparable form
 †Juglans taurina
 Juniperus
 †Juniperus nevadensis

K

 †Kerria
 †Kerria antiqua
 †Kimbetohia
 †Kimbetohia mziae
  Koelreuteria
 †Koelreuteria arnoldi
 †Koelreuteria bipinnatoides
 †Ktunaxia – type locality for genus
 †Ktunaxia jucunda – type locality for species
 †Kukusepasutanka
 †Kukusepasutanka schultzi

L

 †Labidolemur – type locality for genus
 †Labidolemur kayi – type locality for species
  Lasius
 †Lasius glom – type locality for species
 †Lastrea
 †Lastrea goldiana
 †Latiblattella
 †Latiblattella avita – type locality for species
 †Laurophyllum
 †Laurophyllum perseanum
  Laurus
 †Laurus socialis
 †Leguminosites
 †Leidymys
 †Leipsanolestes
 †Leipsanolestes siegfriedti
 Lemmiscus
 †Lemmiscus curtatus
  Lepisosteus
 †Lepisosteus occidentalis
 †Leptacodon
 †Leptacodon munusculum – type locality for species
 †Leptacodon packi – or unidentified comparable form
 †Leptacodon proserpinae
 †Leptacodon tener
 †Leptarctus – type locality for genus
 †Leptarctus primus – type locality for species
  †Leptauchenia
 †Leptauchenia decora
 †Leptauchenia major
  †Leptictis
 †Leptochoerus
  †Leptocyon
 †Leptocyon douglassi – type locality for species
 †Leptodontomys
  †Leptomeryx
 †Leptomeryx esulcatus
 †Leptomeryx evansi
 †Leptomeryx mammifer
 †Leptomeryx speciosus
 †Leptomeryx yoderi – or unidentified comparable form
 †Leptonysson – type locality for genus
 †Leptonysson basiliscus – type locality for species
 †Leptoreodon
 †Leptoreodon marshi
 †Leucaena
 †Leucaena californica
 †Lignimus
 †Limnenetes
 †Limnenetes platyceps – type locality for species
 †Limnoecus
 Lindera
 †Lindera obtusata
 †Lisserpeton
 †Lisserpeton bairdi
 †Litaletes
 †Litaletes disjunctus – type locality for species
  †Lithornis
 †Lithornis celetius – type locality for species
 †Litocherus
 †Litocherus lacunatus
 †Litocherus notissimus – type locality for species
 †Litomylus
 †Litomylus dissentaneus – type locality for species
 †Litomylus ishami – or unidentified comparable form
 †Litomylus orthronepius
 †Loxolophus
 †Loxolophus pentacus
 †Loxolophus schizophrenus
 †Lutetialestes – type locality for genus
 †Lutetialestes uniformis – type locality for species
 Lynx
  †Lynx rufus

M

 †Machaerosaurus
 †Machaerosaurus torrejonensis
  Magnolia
 †Magnolia borealis
 †Magnolia magnifolia
 Mahonia
 †Mahonia hakeaeformis
 †Mahonia limirivuli
 †Mahonia lobodonta
 †Mahonia obliqua
 †Mahonia retculata
 †Mahonia reticulata
 †Mahonia simplex
 †Mahonia subdenticulata
 †Mammut
 †Mammut americanum
 †Mammuthus
  †Mammuthus columbi
  †Mammuthus primigenius
 Marchantia
 †Marchantia lignitica
 †Marchantia pealei
 Marmota
 †Marmota flaviventria
 †Marquettia
 †Marquettia metzeli – type locality for species
 Martes
 †Martes kinseyi – or unidentified comparable form
 †Mcconichthys – type locality for genus
 †Mcconichthys longipinnis – type locality for species
  †Megacerops
 †Megacerops kuwagatarhinus – type locality for species
  †Megahippus
 †Megalagus
 †Megalagus brachyodon – type locality for species
 †Megalagus dawsoni – type locality for species
 †Megalagus turgidus – or unidentified comparable form
  †Megalonyx
 †Megalonyx jeffersonii
  †Megantereon
  †Megatylopus
 †Megatylopus gigas
 †Melastomites
 †Melastomites montanensis
 †Meniscomys
 †Menodus
  †Merriamoceros
  †Merychippus
 †Merychippus sejunctus
 †Merychyus
 †Merychyus arenarum – or unidentified comparable form
 †Merychyus smithi
  †Merycochoerus
 †Merycochoerus chelydra
  †Merycodus
 †Merycodus necatus – or unidentified comparable form
 †Merycoides
 †Merycoides longiceps
  †Merycoidodon
 †Merycoidodon culbertsoni – or unidentified comparable form
 †Mesodma
 †Mesodma ambigua – or unidentified comparable form
 †Mesodma formosa
 †Mesodma garfieldensis – type locality for species
 †Mesodma pygmaea – type locality for species
 †Mesodma thompsoni
 †Mesogaulus
 †Mesogaulus ballensis – type locality for species
 †Mesogaulus douglassi
 †Mesohippus
 †Mesohippus bairdi
 †Mesohippus westoni – type locality for species
  †Mesoreodon
 †Mesoreodon chelonyx
 †Mesoreodon minor – type locality for species
 †Mesoscalops
 †Mesoscalops montanensis – type locality for species
 †Metadjidaumo
 Metasequoia
 †Metasequoia occidentalis
 †Metopium
 †Metopium metopioides
  †Miacis – report made of unidentified related form or using admittedly obsolete nomenclature
 †Microcosmodon
 †Microcosmodon harleyi – type locality for species
 †Micropternodus
 †Micropternodus borealis – type locality for species
 Microtus
 †Microtus pennsylvanicus – or unidentified comparable form
 †Mimatuta
 †Mimatuta minuial
 †Mimatuta morgoth – type locality for species
 †Mimetodon
 †Mimetodon silberlingi – type locality for species
 †Mimosites
 †Mimosites acaciafolius
 †Mimotricentes
 †Mimotricentes fremontensis
 †Mimotricentes tedfordi – tentative report
 †Minerisporites
 †Minerisporites glossoferus (Dijkstra) n. comb.
 †Miniochoerus – tentative report
  †Miohippus – type locality for genus
 †Miohippus anceps – tentative report
 †Miohippus annectens – tentative report
 †Miohippus equiceps – tentative report
 †Miohippus gemmarosae – or unidentified comparable form
 †Miohippus grandis
 †Miohippus obliquidens
 †Miohippus taxus – type locality for species
 †Mionictis – tentative report
 †Miopsyche – tentative report
 †Miopsyche rubiensis – type locality for species
 †Mnium
 †Mnium montanense
 †Mojavemys
 †Monosaulax
 †Monosaulax pansus – tentative report
 †Montanatylopus
 †Montanatylopus matthewi – type locality for species
 †Mookomys
 †Mookomys formicarum – or unidentified comparable form
 †Mookomys thrinax – type locality for species
 Morus
 †Muscites
 †Muscites gracilens
 Mustela
 †Mustela frenata
 †Mustelavus
 †Mustelavus priscus
 Myrica
 †Myrica lignitum
 †Myrica mormonensis
 †Myrica serrulata
 †Myrmecoboides
 †Myrmecoboides montanensis – type locality for species
 †Myrtophyllum
 †Myrtophyllum torreyi
 †Mystipterus
 †Mytonolagus
 †Mytonolagus petersoni – or unidentified comparable form

N

 †Namatomys
 †Namatomys lloydi – type locality for species
 †Nannodectes
 †Nannodectes gidleyi – or unidentified comparable form
 †Nannodectes intermedius
 †Nannodectes simpsoni – or unidentified comparable form
 †Nanodelphys
 †Nanodelphys hunti
 †Nanotragulus
 †Navajovius
 †Nelumbago
 †Nelumbago montanum
  †Nelumbo
  †Neohipparion
 †Neoplagiaulax
 †Neoplagiaulax donaldorum – type locality for species
 †Neoplagiaulax grangeri – type locality for species
 †Neoplagiaulax hunteri – type locality for species
 †Neoplagiaulax kremnus
 †Neoplagiaulax mckennai
 †Neoplagiaulax nelsoni – type locality for species
 †Niglarodon
 †Niglarodon blacki – type locality for species
 †Niglarodon koerneri – type locality for species
 †Niglarodon loneyi – type locality for species
 †Niglarodon progressus
 †Nordenskioldia
 †Nordenskioldia borealis
  †Nuphar
 †Nuphar advenoides
 †Nyctitherium
 †Nymphaeites
 †Nymphaeites nevadensis
 †Nyssa
 †Nyssa alata
 †Nyssa borealis
 †Nyssa crenata

O

 †Ocajila
 †Ocajila makpiyahe – or unidentified comparable form
 †Odaxosaurus
 †Odaxosaurus piger
  Odocoileus – or unidentified comparable form
 †Ogmophis
 †Ogmophis arenarum – type locality for species
 Olar
 †Olar buccinator
 †Oligodontosaurus
 †Oligodontosaurus wyomingensis – or unidentified comparable form
 †Oligoryctes
 †Oligoryctes altitalonidus
 †Oligoryctes cameronensis
 †Oligoscalops
 †Oligotheriomys
 †Oligotheriomys senrudi
  Ondatra
 †Ondatra xibethicus
 †Ondatra zibethicus
  †Onoclea
 †Onoclea hesperia
 †Onychodectes
 †Onychodectes tisonensis
 †Opisthotriton
 †Opisthotriton gidleyi – type locality for species
 †Opisthotriton kayi
  Oreohelix
 †Oreolagus
 †Oreolagus nevadensis
 †Oreonetes
 †Oreonetes anceps
 †Oreonetes douglassi
 †Osmanthus
 †Osmanthus praemissa
  †Osmunda
 †Osmunda greenlandica
 †Osmunda macrophylla
 †Osmunda occidentalis
 Ostrya
 †Ostrya oregoniana
 †Otarocyon
 †Otarocyon macdonaldi
 †Oxyacodon
 †Oxyacodon apiculatus
 †Oxyacodon ferronensis
 †Oxyacodon marshater
 †Oxyclaenus
 †Oxyclaenus pugnax
  †Oxydactylus
 †Oxydactylus lacota – or unidentified comparable form
 †Oxyprimus
 †Oxyprimus erikseni – type locality for species

P

 †Paciculus
 †Pagonomus – or unidentified comparable form
 †Palaechthon – type locality for genus
 †Palaechthon alticuspis – type locality for species
 †Palaechthon woodi – or unidentified comparable form
 †Palaeictops
 †Palaeocarpinus
  †Palaeogale
 †Palaeogale sectoria
 †Palaeohypnum
 †Palaeohypnum beckeri
 †Palaeolabrus
 †Palaeolabrus montanensis – or unidentified comparable form
  †Palaeolagus
 †Palaeolagus burkei
 †Palaeolagus haydeni
 †Palaeolagus hypsodus
 †Palaeolagus intermedius
 †Palaeolagus temnodon – type locality for species
 †Palaeophytocrene
 †Palaeoryctes
  †Palaeosinopa
 †Palaeosinopa didelphoides – or unidentified comparable form
  †Palaeosyops
 †Palaeosyops fontinalis
 †Palaeoxantusia
 †Palaeoxantusia fera
 †Palatobaena
 †Palatobaena bairdi
 †Palenochtha – type locality for genus
 †Palenochtha minor – type locality for species
 †Paleonelumbo
 †Paleonelumbo macroloba
 †Paleonuphar
 †Paleonuphar hesperium
 †Paleopsephurus – or unidentified comparable form
 †Paleotomus
 †Paleotomus senior – type locality for species
  Paliurus
 †Paliurus dumosus
 †Paliurus florissanti
 †Pandemonium
 †Pandemonium dis – type locality for species
  †Pantolambda
 †Pantolambda intermedius – type locality for species
 †Pantomimus – type locality for genus
 †Pantomimus leari – type locality for species
 †Paracosoryx
 †Paradjidaumo
 †Paradjidaumo spokanensis – type locality for species
 †Paradjidaumo trilophus
 †Paramerychyus
 †Paramerychyus harrisonensis
  †Paramylodon
 †Paramylodon harlani
 †Paramys
 †Paramys relictus
 †Paranymphaea
 †Paranymphaea crassifolia
 †Parapliosaccomys
 †Parapliosaccomys annae – or unidentified comparable form
 †Pararyctes
 †Pararyctes pattersoni
 †Paratomarctus
 †Paratomarctus temerarius
 †Parectypodus
 †Parectypodus sinclairi – type locality for species
 †Parectypodus sylviae
 †Pareumys – tentative report
 †Parictis
 †Parictis montanus
 †Paromomys
 †Paromomys depressidens – type locality for species
 †Paromomys maturus – type locality for species
  †Parthenocissus
 †Parthenocissus ursina
 †Parvericius
 †Parvericius montanus
  †Paulownia
 †Paulownia columbiana
 †Paulownia thomsoni
  †Peltosaurus
 †Pelycomys
 †Penetrigonias
 †Penetrigonias dakotensis
 †Penosphyllum
 †Penosphyllum cordatum
  Penthetria
 †Penthetria abacula – type locality for species
 †Penthetria alderensis – type locality for species
 †Penthetria rubiensis – type locality for species
 †Peraceras
 †Peraceras profectum
 †Peraceras superciliosum
 †Peradectes
 †Peradectes elegans – or unidentified comparable form
 †Peradectes minor – type locality for species
 †Peradectes protinnominatus – or unidentified comparable form
 †Peridiomys
 †Peridiomys halis – type locality for species
 †Periptychus
 †Perognathoides
 †Perognathoides eurekensis – or unidentified comparable form
 Perognathus
 †Perognathus ancenensis – type locality for species
 Peromyscus
  †Peromyscus maniculatus – or unidentified comparable form
  Persea
 †Persea brossiana
 †Petauristodon
 †Phasmatopelecinus – type locality for genus
 †Phasmatopelecinus leonae – type locality for species
 †Phenacodaptes – or unidentified comparable form
 †Phenacodaptes sabulosus
  †Phenacodus
 †Phenacodus bisonensis
 †Phenacodus intermedius
 †Phenacodus magnus
  Phragmites
 †Phragmites alaskana
 †Phthiria
 †Phthiria fossa – type locality for species
 †Phyllites
 †Phyllites demoresi
 †Phyllites disturbans
 Picea
 †Picea lahontensis
 †Picea magna
 †Picea sonomensis
 †Piceoerpeton
 †Piceoerpeton willwoodense
 †Picrodus
 †Picrodus canpacius
 †Picrodus silberlingi – type locality for species
  Pinus
 †Pinus florissanti
 †Pinus wheeleri
 †Pipestoneia – type locality for genus
 †Pipestoneia douglassi – type locality for species
 †Pipestoneomys
 †Pipestoneomys bisulcatus
 †Pithecolobium
 †Pithecolobium eocenicum
 †Planatus
 †Planatus nobilis
 †Planatus raynoldsi
 †Planetetherium
 †Planetetherium mirabile – type locality for species
 †Plastomenoides – type locality for genus
 †Plastomenoides lamberti – type locality for species
 †Plastomenoides tetanetron – type locality for species
 †Plastomenus – or unidentified comparable form
  Platanus
 †Platanus dissecta
 †Platanus nobilis
 †Platanus raynoldsi
 †Platanus raynoldsii
 †Platanus stenoloba
  Plecia
 †Plecia inflata – type locality for species
  †Plesiadapis
 †Plesiadapis anceps – type locality for species
 †Plesiadapis churchilli – type locality for species
 †Plesiadapis praecursor – type locality for species
 †Plesiadapis rex – type locality for species
 †Plesiolestes
 †Plesiolestes problematicus
 †Pleurolicus
 †Plioceros
 †Plioceros blicki – or unidentified comparable form
  †Pliohippus
 †Plionictis
 †Plionictis ogygia
  †Plithocyon
 †Plithocyon ursinus
 †Poacites
  †Poebrotherium
 †Poebrotherium eximium – or unidentified comparable form
 †Poebrotherium wilsoni
  †Pogonodon
 †Ponerites
 †Ponerites kishenehne – type locality for species
 Populus
 †Populus adamantea
 †Populus balsamoides
 †Populus cedrusensis
 †Populus cinnamomoides
 †Populus eotremuloides
 †Populus lindgreni
 †Populus nebrascensis
 †Populus payettensis
 †Populus washoensis
 †Potamanthellus
 †Potamanthellus rubiensis – type locality for species
 †Potentilla
 †Potentilla horkelioides
 †Potentilla salmonensis
 †Pradjidaumo
 †Pradjidaumo trilophus
 †Preissites
 †Preissites wardi
 †Preissites wardii
 †Procerberus
 †Procerberus formicarum – type locality for species
 †Procerberus grandis – or unidentified comparable form
 †Procerberus plutonis
 †Prochetodon
 †Prochetodon foxi – type locality for species
 †Prodesmodon
 †Prodesmodon copei
 †Prodiacodon
 †Prodiacodon concordiarcensis – type locality for species
 †Prodiacodon crustulum – type locality for species
 †Prodiacodon furor – type locality for species
  †Proiridomyrmex
 †Proiridomyrmex rotundatus – type locality for species
 †Prokalotermes
 †Prokalotermes alderensis – type locality for species
  †Promerycochoerus
 †Promerycochoerus superbus
 †Promioclaenus
 †Promioclaenus acolytus
 †Pronodens
 †Pronodens silberlingi – type locality for species
 †Pronothodectes
 †Pronothodectes matthewi – type locality for species
 †Propalaeosinopa
 †Propalaeosinopa albertensis
 †Proscalops
 †Proscalops intermedius – type locality for species
 †Prosciurus
 †Prosciurus parvus – or unidentified comparable form
 †Prosciurus vetustus – type locality for species
 †Prosphyracephala
 †Prosphyracephala rubiensis – type locality for species
  †Protazteca
 †Protazteca eocenica – type locality for species
 †Protentomodon
 †Protentomodon ursirivalis – type locality for species
 †Prothryptacodon
 †Prothryptacodon furens – type locality for species
 †Protictis
 †Protictis haydenianus
 †Protictis microlestes
 †Protochriacus
 †Protochriacus simplex
  †Protohippus
 †Protolabis
 †Protolabis gracilis – or unidentified comparable form
 †Protoreodon
 †Protoreodon pearcei
 †Protoreodon pumilus
 †Protungulatum
  †Protungulatum donnae
 †Protungulatum gorgun – type locality for species
 †Protungulatum sloani – type locality for species
 †Provaranosaurus – or unidentified comparable form
 †Proxestops
 †Proxestops silberlingi
 †Proxestops silberlingii – type locality for species
  Prunus
 †Prunus careyhurstia
 †Prunus corrugis
 †Prunus lyoniifolia – type locality for species
 †Prunus morangensis
 †Prunus perita
 †Prunus scottii
 †Prunus wilcoxiana
  †Pseudhipparion
 †Pseudocylindrodon
 †Pseudocylindrodon medius – type locality for species
 †Pseudocylindrodon neglectus – type locality for species
  †Pseudolarix
 †Pseudolarix americana
 †Pseudomesoreodon – type locality for genus
 †Pseudomesoreodon rooneyi – type locality for species
  Pseudomyrmex
 †Pseudomyrmex saxulum – type locality for species
 †Pseudotettigonia
 †Pseudotettigonia leona – type locality for species
 †Pseudotheridomys
 †Pseudotrimylus
  †Pseudotsuga
 †Pseudotsuga longifolia
 †Pseudotsuga sonomensis
  †Psittacotherium
 †Psittacotherium multifragum
 Ptelea
 †Ptelea miocenica
 †Ptenidium
 †Ptenidium kishenehnicum – type locality for species
 Pteris
 Pterocarya
 †Pterocarya hispida
  †Ptilodus
 †Ptilodus kummae
 †Ptilodus montanus – type locality for species
 †Ptilodus tsosiensis
  †Purgatorius
 †Purgatorius janisae – type locality for species
 †Purgatorius titusi – type locality for species
 †Purgatorius unio – type locality for species
 †Pyracantha
 †Pyracantha spatulata – type locality for species

Q

  Quercus
 †Quercus convexa
 †Quercus dayana
 †Quercus dispersa – tentative report
 †Quercus eoprinus
 †Quercus hannibali
 †Quercus prelobata
 †Quercus prevariabilis
 †Quercus pseudolyrata
 †Quercus simulata
 †Quercus sullyi
 †Quercus winstanleyi

R

 †Rana – or unidentified comparable form
 Rangifer
  †Rangifer tarandus
 †Rhamnites
 †Rhamnites pseudostenophyllus
 †Rhamnus
 †Rhamnus cleburni
 †Rhamnus crocea
 †Rhamnus hirsuta
  Rhus
 †Rhus milleri
 †Rhus miosuccedanea
 †Rhus obscura
 †Rhus praeovata
 †Rhus stellariaefolia
 †Robinia
 †Robinia californica
 †Robinia lesquereuxi
 Rosa
 †Rosa hilliae

S

  Sabal
 †Sabal grayana
 †Sabal imperialis
 †Sabal powelli
 †Saccoloma
 †Saccoloma gardneri
  Salix
 †Salix aquilina
 †Salix cockerelli
 †Salix hesperia
 †Salix knowltoni
 †Salix laevigatoides
 †Salix longiacuminata
 †Salix schimperi
 †Salix stipulata – type locality for species
 †Salix succorensis
 †Salix taxifolioides
 †Salix truckeana
 †Salix wildcatensis
 †Salix wimmeriana
 †Sambucus
 †Sambucus newtoni
 †Sapindus
 †Sapindus coloradensis
 Sassafras
 †Sassafras ashleyi
 †Sassafras columbiana
  †Sassafras hesperia
 †Sassafras thermale
 †Scalopoides
 †Scapherpeton
 †Scapherpeton tectum
  †Scaphohippus
 †Scaphohippus intermontanus – or unidentified comparable form
 †Scenopagus
 †Schizotheriodes
 †Schizotheriodes parvus – type locality for species
 †Scotiophryne – or unidentified comparable form
 †Scottimus
 †Scottimus longiquus – type locality for species
 †Scottimus viduus
 †Selaginella
 †Selaginella collieri
 †Selaginella monstrosa
 †Senoprosopis
 †Senoprosopis beckeri – type locality for species
 Sequoia
  †Sequoia affinis
 †Sespemys – tentative report
  †Simoedosaurus
 †Simpson
 †Simpson lists
 †Simpsonictis
 †Simpsonictis tenuis
 †Smilax
 †Smilax trinervis
 †Solenopsites
 †Solenopsites abdita – type locality for species
 †Sophora
 †Sophora spokanensis
 †Sorbus
 †Sorbus harneyensis
 †Sparganium
 †Sparganium antiquum
 Spea
 †Spea neuter
 Spermophilus
 †Spermophilus jerae – type locality for species
 †Spermophilus primitivus
 †Spermophilus richardsonii
 †Spiraea
 †Spiraea clavidens
 †Spiraea decurrens
 †Stelocyon
 †Stelocyon arctylos – type locality for species
  †Steneofiber
 †Steneofiber gradatus – or unidentified comparable form
 †Steneofiber hesperus
 †Stenoechinus
 †Stenoechinus tantalus – type locality for species
  †Stenomylus
 †Stenomylus hitchcocki – or unidentified comparable form
  Sterculia
 †Sterculia wilcoxiana
 †Stibarus
 †Stibarus montanus – type locality for species
 †Stilpnodon
 †Stilpnodon simplicidens – type locality for species
 †Stygimys
 †Stygimys camptorhiza – or unidentified comparable form
 †Stygimys gratus
 †Stygimys jepseni – type locality for species
 †Stygimys kuszmauli – type locality for species
  †Subdromomeryx
 †Subdromomeryx antilopinus
  †Subhyracodon
 †Subhyracodon mitis
 †Subhyracodon occidentalis
 †Submerycochoerus
 †Submerycochoerus bannackensis – type locality for species
 Sylvicola – or unidentified related form
 †Sylvicola fenestralis
 Sylvilagus
 †Sylvilagus nuttallii
 †Symplocarpus
 †Symplocarpus prefoetidus

T

  †Taeniolabis
 †Taeniolabis lamberti – type locality for species
  †Tapocyon
 †Tapocyon robustus
 †Tardontia
 †Tardontia occidentale – or unidentified comparable form
 Taricha
 †Taricha miocenica – type locality for species
 Taxodium
 †Taxodium dubium
 †Taxodium olriki
 †Tectochara
 †Tectochara grambastorum
  †Teleoceras
 †Tenudomys – tentative report
 †Tephrodytes – type locality for genus
 †Tephrodytes brassicarvalis – type locality for species
 †Ternstroemites
 †Ternstroemites aureavallis
 †Tetraclaenodon
 †Tetraclaenodon puercensis
 Thomomys
 †Thomomys taloides
  †Thomomys talpoides
 †Thrinax
 †Thrinax dorfi
 †Thryptacodon
 †Thryptacodon australis – or unidentified comparable form
 †Thryptacodon orthogonius – tentative report
 †Thryptacodon pseudarctos – type locality for species
 †Thuja
 †Thuja dimorpha
 †Thuja interrupta
 †Thylacodon
 †Thylacodon montanensis – type locality for species
 †Thylacodon pusillus – or unidentified comparable form
  †Ticholeptus
 †Ticholeptus zygomaticus
 Tilia
 †Tilia aspera
 †Tilia inaequalis
 †Tinuviel
 †Tinuviel eurydice
  Tipula
 †Tipula carolae – type locality for species
 †Tipula rubiensis – type locality for species
  †Titanoides
 †Titanoides gidleyi
  †Trapa
 †Trapa angulata
 †Trapa paulula
 †Tricentes
 †Tricentes subtrigonus
 †Trigenicus
 †Trigenicus profectus
  †Trigonias
 †Trigonias osborni
 †Trilaccogaulus
 †Trilaccogaulus montanensis
 †Triplopides
 †Triplopides rieli – type locality for species
 †Triplopus
 †Triplopus rhinocerinus – or unidentified comparable form
 †Trochodendroides
 †Trochodendroides flabella
 †Trogolemur – tentative report
 †Tropidia
 †Tropidia tumulata – type locality for species
 †Tullochelys
 †Tullochelys montana
 †Tylocephalonyx
 Typha
 †Typha lesquereuxi

U

 †Ulmeriella
 †Ulmeriella rubiensis – type locality for species
  Ulmus
 †Ulmus montanensis
 †Ulmus moorei
 †Ulmus paucidentata
 †Ulmus rhamnifolia
 †Ulmus speciosa
 †Unuchinia
 †Unuchinia asaphes – type locality for species
 †Ursolestes – type locality for genus
 †Ursolestes perpetior – type locality for species
 Ursus

V

  †Vaccinium
 †Vaccinium sophoroides
 †Valenopsalis
 †Valenopsalis joyneri – type locality for species
 †Vauquelinia
 †Vauquelinia coloradensis
 †Vauquelinia coloradica
 †Viburnum
 †Viburnum antiquorum
 †Viburnum kraeuseli
 †Viguiera
 †Viguiera cronquisti
  Vitis
 †Vitis lobata
 †Vitis muscadinioides
 †Vitis olriki
 †Vitis washingtonensis
 †Viverravus – tentative report

W

 †Wilsoneumys
  †Woodwardia
 †Woodwardia arctica
 †Wortmania – or unidentified comparable form

X

 †Xyronomys

Z

  Zelkova
 †Zelkova drymeja
 †Zelkova hesperia
 †Zelkova krymeja
 †Zelkova nervosa
 †Zelkova oregoniana
 †Zelkova planeroides
 †Zelkova ungeri
 †Zeunerella – tentative report
 †Zeunerella lewisi – type locality for species
 †Zygodactylus
 †Zygodactylus ochlurus – type locality for species

References

 

Cenozoic
Montana
Life